Park Mi-Young ( or ; born November 17, 1981 in Daegu, Republic of Korea) is a  South Korean table tennis player. She was part of the table tennis team that won a bronze medal in the 2008 Summer Olympics. Park currently plays for the Samsung Life Insurance Table Tennis team and is ranked 24th in the world as of October 2011. She qualified directly for the 2012 Summer Olympics in May 2011.  At the 2012 Summer Olympics, she reached the last 16 in the women's individual, and placed fourth with the South Korean women's team.

Career records
Singles (as of February 24, 2015)
Olympics: round of 16 (2008, 2012).
World Championships: round of 16 (2009).
World Cup appearances: 2. Record: 5-8th (2009, 10).
Pro Tour winner (2): Chile Open 2006; Japan Open 2009. Runner-up (1): Polish Open 2009.
Pro Tour Grand Finals appearances: 3. Record: QF (2009).
Asian Cup: 7th (2006).

Women's doubles
World Championships: SF (2007, 09, 11).
Pro Tour winner (6): Swedish Open 2007; Brazil Open 2008; Korea, English Open 2009; Korea Open 2010, Spanish Open 2012. Runner-up (5): Brazil Open 2005; Japan, German Open 2007; Qatar Open 2008; Qatar Open 2010, Korea Open 2011.
Pro Tour Grand Finals appearances: 5. Record: runner-up (2007, 08).
Asian Games: QF (2006).
Asian Championships: runner-up (2009).

Mixed doubles
World Championships: QF (2007).

Team
Olympics: 3rd (2008).
World Championships: 3rd (2012).
World Team Cup: 2nd (2007); 3rd (2010).

References

South Korean female table tennis players
Olympic bronze medalists for South Korea
Olympic table tennis players of South Korea
Table tennis players at the 2008 Summer Olympics
1981 births
Living people
Olympic medalists in table tennis
Table tennis players at the 2012 Summer Olympics
Medalists at the 2008 Summer Olympics
Asian Games medalists in table tennis
Table tennis players at the 2006 Asian Games
Table tennis players at the 2010 Asian Games
Sportspeople from Daegu
Medalists at the 2006 Asian Games
Medalists at the 2010 Asian Games
Asian Games bronze medalists for South Korea
World Table Tennis Championships medalists
21st-century South Korean women